Halsey Joseph Boardman (born May 19, 1834 – January 15, 1900) was a Massachusetts lawyer and politician who served in, and as the President of the Boston, Massachusetts Common Council,  in the Massachusetts House of Representatives and as a member and President of, the Massachusetts Senate.

Early life
Boardman was born on May 19, 1834, to Nathaniel and Sarah (Hunt) Boardman in Norwich, Vermont.

Family life
Boardman married Georgia M. Hinman on November 6, 1861, they had two children, Flora M. Boardman, and Emily I. Boardman.

Death
Boardman died on January 15, 1900, at his home in Boston, Massachusetts.

See also
 109th Massachusetts General Court (1888)

References

1834 births
1900 deaths
Massachusetts lawyers
Boston City Council members
Republican Party members of the Massachusetts House of Representatives
Republican Party Massachusetts state senators
Presidents of the Massachusetts Senate
Dartmouth College alumni
19th-century American politicians
19th-century American lawyers